Ivana Sert (née Smiljković, ; born 25 October 1979) is a Serbian-Turkish television personality, socialite, presenter, model, fashion designer, entrepreneur, businesswoman, beauty pageant titleholder, author, and occasional actress. She is the founder of the Ivana Sert brand and was known for her role as a judge on Show TV's Bugün Ne Giysem? (2010–13). After that Sert joined the TV show İşte Benim Stilim.

Early life and career
She was born as "Ivana Smiljković" in 1979 in Zaječar, Serbia. Before pursuing a career in modeling, she studied piano and ballet until the age of 16. Having been crowned Miss Belgrade in 1999, she competed in the Miss Yugoslavia and Miss Globe International pageants.

In 2002, she moved to Turkey. It was in Istanbul that she met her husband Yurdal, son of prominent real estate developer Mehmet Sert. The couple married in 2004 and became leading figures in Turkish high society. On 31 October 2006, she gave birth to her only child, Kayon Ateş,.

In 2011, after heating up the stage on Yok Böyle Dans, the Turkish version of Dancing With the Stars, Ivana Sert withdrew from the competition because of her doctor's advice in week 12.

In 2012, Sert appeared as a special guest star in the thirty fourth episode of the Kanal D series Yalan Dünya as herself. She is the co-host of the television program En Büyük Show that airs on Show TV.

Ivana Sert is the author of the 2012 book Bizimlesin. The book gives out fashion and beauty tips, accompanied by her own photos.

As of 2018, she is a member of the judging panel of another fashion-related show.

Filmography

Film and television

Guest appearances

Discography
"İmalat Hatası" (2019)

Publications
Bizimlesin (2012)

References

External links
 

1979 births
Living people
Naturalized citizens of Turkey
People from Zaječar
People with acquired Turkish citizenship
Serbian beauty pageant winners
Serbian businesspeople
Serbian expatriates in Turkey
Serbian entertainers
Serbian fashion designers
Serbian female models
Serbian socialites
Serbian television actresses
Serbian women fashion designers
Serbian television presenters
Serbian writers
Television judges
Turkish beauty pageant winners
Turkish businesspeople
Turkish entertainers
Turkish fashion designers
Turkish female models
Turkish socialites
Turkish television actresses
Turkish television presenters
Turkish women television presenters
Turkish women in business
Turkish writers
Yugoslav beauty pageant winners
Serbian women in business
Serbian women television presenters
Turkish people of Serbian descent
Turkish women fashion designers